Dieppe is a two-part Canadian television miniseries that aired on CBC Television in 1993. It was based on the book Unauthorized Action: Mountbatten and the Dieppe Raid by Brian Loring Villa.

Plot
The series chronicled the events that led up to the infamous World War II Dieppe Raid on August 19, 1942, which resulted in 3,367 Canadian soldiers either being captured, wounded or killed.

Cast

Production
It was criticized for not being completely accurate, and overdramatizing the events that took place.

Awards
Dieppe was nominated for 11 Gemini Awards, winning two including Best Mini-Series.

Home media
The series was released on DVD by the CBC in 2002 just before the 60th anniversary of the Dieppe raid. The DVD included behind-the-scenes footage and various interviews and news stories that aired about the show in 1993 and 1994. Also included was a 1962 interview with both Lord Louis Mountbatten and John Hamilton Roberts, in which they discuss the key events of the raid, and the decisions they made surrounding this event.

References

External links
 

CBC Television original films
World War II television drama series
1990s Canadian television miniseries
1993 Canadian television series debuts
1994 Canadian television series endings
English-language Canadian films
Films directed by John N. Smith
Canadian Armed Forces in films
Cultural depictions of Louis Mountbatten, 1st Earl Mountbatten of Burma
Cultural depictions of Winston Churchill
Cultural depictions of Bernard Montgomery
Cultural depictions of Dwight D. Eisenhower
Gemini and Canadian Screen Award for Best Television Film or Miniseries winners
Canadian drama television films